Muppets TV is a French television series in ten 45-minute episodes, produced by Sébastien Cauet for The Muppets Studio, based on the characters from The Muppet Show created by Jim Henson, and broadcast between 29 October and 31 December 2006 on TF1.

Synopsis
In this French version of The Muppet Show, Kermit receives a main guest on a television set. During the show, several other personalities appear in short sequences.

French voices
 Sébastien Cauet as Kermit the Frog
 Franck Sportis as Miss Piggy
 Marc Duquenoy as Fozzie Bear, Gonzo, Clifford, Newsman
 Cartman as Scooter
 Miko as Animal
 Pierre Dourlens as Statler
 Jean-François Kopf as Waldorf

Puppeteers
 Christophe Albertini
 Charlie Bazir
 Yves Brunier
 Regis Fassier
 Sandrine Furrer
 Erwan Courtioux
 Pascal Meunier
 Francoise Salmon
 Boris Scheigam: artistic director puppeteers
 Evelyne Scheigam
 Cyril Valade

Development
The series sprung from a 2005 deal which French radio comedian/producer Sébastien Cauet and French network TF1 made with Disney. The actual puppets were sent to France, and Cauet supplied the voice of Kermit (using a blend of French Kermit Roger Carel's voice and Jim Henson's characterization). Other of Cauet's radio colleagues supplied character voices, while French puppeteers, led by Yves Brunier, supplied the actual puppetry.
 
The 15 minute pilot debuted over TF1 in November, 2005, with French actor/humorist Franck Dubosc as the featured guest. Segments included a parody of the French TV series Mon Incroyable Fiancé (retitled Mon Incroyable Muppet) and Piggy, ever sensual, pursuing guest star Dubosc.
 
The full series aired Sundays at 5:30pm as a 45 minute block, and in 5 minute segments Monday through Friday, taken from the best sketches and bits. In contrast to The Muppet Show and more in keeping with Muppets Tonight, each episode featured two guest stars.
 
The series also made extensive use of the established Muppet cast. The primary cast went beyond Kermit, Miss Piggy, Fozzie Bear, Gonzo, and Statler and Waldorf and featured "classic" Muppets including Scooter, Rowlf, Dr. Bunsen Honeydew and Beaker, the full ensemble of Dr. Teeth and the Electric Mayhem, the Swedish Chef, Clifford and the Newsman, as well as Denise, a new character recycled from the Loni Dunne puppet, and several other Whatnots.
 
10 full 45-minute episodes were produced in 2006 for the first batch of shows. However due to station management changes and poor ratings, TF1 opted not to order a second set of Muppets TV episodes.

List of episodes
 Adriana Karembeu and Pascal Obispo
 Elie Semoun and Bob Sinclar
 Anggun and Michaël Youn
 Liane Foly and David Douillet
 Lara Fabian and Titoff
 Florent Pagny and Florence Foresti
 Franck Dubosc and Lorie
 Laurent Voulzy and Patrick Bosso
 Mimie Mathy, Stéphane Rousseau, Nikos Aliagas, Philippe Lelièvre and Richard Cross
 Sébastien Cauet, Alexandra Rosenfeld, M. Pokora and Tina Arena

Comments
 In this French version, Miss Piggy is referred to as Miss Peggy. The French confusing the first name Peggy with that of Piggy, diminutive of Pig (Cochon in English) which means here "little slut" or Piggy the slut in "The Muppet Show".
 For lack of audience, only ten episodes were broadcast.

References

External links
 

The Muppets television series
2000s French television series
French television shows featuring puppetry
2006 French television series debuts
2006 French television series endings
TF1 original programming